La Hoyada is a Caracas Metro station on Line 1. It was opened on 2 January 1983 as the eastern terminus of the inaugural section of Line 1 between Propatria and La Hoyada. On 27 March 1983 the line was extended to Chacaíto. The station is between Capitolio and Parque Carabobo.

References 

Caracas Metro stations
1983 establishments in Venezuela
Railway stations opened in 1983